The Third Parties (Rights against Insurers) Act 2010 received royal assent on 25 March 2010. Its long title describes it as 

It came into force on 1 August 2016, removing a provision in the Third Parties (Rights against Insurers) Act 1930 which required a third party claimant affected by the insolvency of an insured party to obtain a judgment on the insurer's liability before being able to issue proceedings. Since 2016, the third party claimant has been able to issue proceedings directly against the insurer. Schedule 1 to the Act also established a regime under which information about the insolvent party's insurance could be made available to a person with a "reasonable belief" that they had a transferred right to claim.

The Act came into force over six years after its royal assent. The delay holding back its "long awaited" implementation was related to certain shortcomings concerning business insolvency, administration and dissolution, which were addressed in the Insurance Act 2015.

The Third Parties (Rights against Insurers) Act 1930, and its Northern Ireland equivalent, the Third Parties (Rights Against Insurers) Act (Northern Ireland) 1930, were repealed by the 2010 Act. In 2001, the Law Commission of England and Wales and the Scottish Law Commission reviewed the 1930 legislation and found that it was not working as well as it should. The two commissions' final report set out proposals for reform which were largely reproduced in the new Act. 

The 1930 Acts continue to apply in certain circumstances.

References

Insurance legislation
2010 legislation